.pe is the Internet country code top-level domain (ccTLD) for Peru.

It is managed by the company Red Científica Peruana (RCP).

Second-level domains 

Starting from December 8, 2007 the registry accepts registrations directly at the second level.

Prior to this change in policy registrations were limited to third level domains under these second level domains:

 edu.pe: Educational Institutions of Peru
 gob.pe: Government of Peru
 nom.pe: Individuals from Peru
 mil.pe: Military of Peru
 sld.pe: Health System of Peru
 org.pe: Organizations of Peru
 ngo.pe: NGOs of Peru
 com.pe: Commercial entities of Peru
 net.pe: Network providers of Peru

External links 
 IANA .pe whois information

Country code top-level domains
Communications in Peru
Mass media in Peru

sv:Toppdomän#P